The PHIVOLCS Earthquake Intensity Scale (PEIS) is a seismic scale used and developed by the Philippine Institute of Volcanology and Seismology (PHIVOLCS) to measure the intensity of earthquakes.

It was developed as upon a specific response to the 1990 Luzon earthquake. PHIVOLCS cites seismic scale specifically developed for the Philippine setting, the different geography of each country and other "geological considerations" led to the development of PEIS. The scale measures the effect of an earthquake on a given area based on its relative effect to people, structures and objects in the surroundings.

The PEIS was adopted in the Philippines in 1996 replacing the Rossi-Forel scale.

Scales
The PEIS has ten intensity scales represented in Roman numerals with Intensity I being the weakest and Intensity X being the strongest.

References

Public domain sources

External links
PHIVOLCS Earthquake Intensity Scale at the Philippine Institute of Volcanology and Seismology

Seismic intensity scales
1996 introductions
Geology of the Philippines
Department of Science and Technology (Philippines)